Carol Jacobs may refer to:
 Carol Lady Haynes, née Jacobs, Jamaican-Barbadian doctor and politician
 Carol Jacobs (academic), literary scholar